The Institute for Advanced Study (IAS) is an independent center for theoretical research and intellectual inquiry located in Princeton, New Jersey. It has served as the academic home of internationally preeminent scholars, including J. Robert Oppenheimer, Albert Einstein,  Hermann Weyl, John von Neumann, and Kurt Gödel, many of whom had emigrated from Europe to the United States.

It was founded in 1930 by American educator Abraham Flexner, together with philanthropists Louis Bamberger and Caroline Bamberger Fuld. Despite collaborative ties and neighboring geographic location, the institute, being independent, has "no formal links" with Princeton University. The institute does not charge tuition or fees.

Flexner's guiding principle in founding the institute was the pursuit of knowledge for its own sake. The faculty have no classes to teach. There are no degree programs or experimental facilities at the institute. Research is never contracted or directed. It is left to each individual researcher to pursue their own goals. Established during the rise of fascism in Europe, the institute played a key role in the transfer of intellectual capital from Europe to America. It quickly earned its reputation as the pinnacle of academic and scientific life—a reputation it has retained.

The institute consists of four schools: Historical Studies, Mathematics, Natural Sciences, and Social Sciences. The institute also has a program in Systems Biology.

It is supported entirely by endowments, grants, and gifts. It is one of eight American mathematics institutes funded by the National Science Foundation. It is the model for all ten members of the consortium Some Institutes for Advanced Study.

History

Founding

The institute was founded in 1930 by Abraham Flexner, together with philanthropists Louis Bamberger and Caroline Bamberger Fuld. Flexner was interested in education generally and as early as 1890 he had founded an experimental school which had no formal curriculum, exams, or grades.  It was a great success at preparing students for prestigious colleges and this same philosophy would later guide him in the founding of the Institute for Advanced Study. 
Flexner's study of medical schools, the 1910 Flexner Report, played a major role in the reform of medical education. 
Flexner had studied European schools such as Heidelberg University, All Souls College, Oxford, and the Collège de France–and he wanted to establish a similar advanced research center in the United States.

In his autobiography Abraham Flexner reports a phone call which he received in the fall of 1929 from representatives of the Bamberger siblings that led to their partnership and the eventual founding of the IAS:

The Bamberger siblings wanted to use the proceeds from the sale of their Bamberger’s department store in Newark, New Jersey, to fund a dental school as an expression of gratitude to the state of New Jersey. Flexner convinced them to put their money in the service of more abstract research. (There was a brush with  near-disaster when the Bambergers pulled their money out of the market just before the Crash of 1929.) The eminent topologist Oswald Veblen at Princeton University, who had long been trying to found a high-level research institute in mathematics, urged Flexner to locate the new institute near Princeton where it would be close to an existing center of learning and a world-class library.  In 1932 Veblen resigned from Princeton and became the first professor in the new Institute for Advanced Study.  He selected most of the original faculty and also helped the institute acquire land in Princeton for both the original facility and future expansion.

Flexner and Veblen set out to recruit the best mathematicians and physicists they could find. The rise of fascism and the associated anti-semitism forced many prominent mathematicians to flee Europe and some, such as Einstein and Hermann Weyl (whose wife was Jewish), found a home at the new institute. Weyl as a condition of accepting insisted that the institute also appoint the thirty-year-old Austrian-Hungarian polymath John von Neumann.  Indeed, the IAS became the key lifeline for scholars fleeing Europe.  Einstein was Flexner's first coup and shortly after that he was followed by Veblen's brilliant student James Alexander and the wunderkind of logic Kurt Gödel. Flexner was fortunate in the luminaries he directly recruited but also in the people that they brought along with them.  Thus, by 1934 the fledgeling institute was led by six of the most prominent mathematicians in the world.  In 1935 quantum physics pioneer Wolfgang Pauli became a faculty member. With the opening of the Institute for Advanced Study,  Princeton replaced Göttingen as the leading center for mathematics in the twentieth century.

Early years
For the six years from its opening in 1933, until Fuld Hall was finished and opened in 1939, the institute was housed within Princeton University—in Fine Hall, which housed Princeton's mathematics department. Princeton University's science departments are less than two miles away and informal ties and collaboration between the two institutions occurred from the beginning. This helped start an incorrect impression that it was part of the university, one that has never been completely eradicated.

On June 4, 1930, the Bambergers wrote as follows to the institute's trustees:

Bamberger's policy did not prevent racial discrimination by Princeton.  When African-American mathematician William S. Claytor applied to the IAS in 1937, Princeton University said they "would not permit any colored person to go to the Institute for Advanced Study."  It was not until 1939, when the institute had moved into its own building, that Veblen was able to offer Claytor a position; but this time Claytor turned it down on principle.

Flexner had successfully assembled a faculty of unrivaled prestige in the School of Mathematics which officially opened in 1933. He sought to equal this success in the founding of schools of economics and humanities but this proved to be more difficult.  The School of Humanistic Studies and the School of Economics and Politics were established in 1935.  All three schools along with the office of the director moved into the newly built Fuld Hall in 1939. (Ultimately the schools of  Humanistic Studies and Economics  and Politics were merged into the present day School of Historical Studies established in 1949.) In the beginning, the School of Mathematics included physicists as well as mathematicians.  A separate School of Natural Sciences was not established until 1966. The School of Social Science was founded in 1973.

Mission
In a 1939 essay Flexner emphasized how James Clerk Maxwell, driven only by a desire to know, did abstruse calculations in the field of magnetism and electricity and that these investigations led in a direct line to the entire electrical development of modern times. Citing Maxwell and other theoretical scientists such as Gauss, Faraday, Ehrlich and Einstein, Flexner said, "Throughout the whole history of science most of the really great discoveries which have ultimately proved to be beneficial to mankind have been made by men and women who were driven not by the desire to be useful but merely the desire to satisfy their curiosity."

The IAS Bluebook says:

This was the belief to which Flexner clung passionately, and which continues to inspire the institute today.

Impact

From the day it opened the IAS had a major impact on mathematics, physics, economic theory, and world affairs. In mathematics forty-two out of sixty-one Fields Medalists have been affiliated with the institute. Thirty-four Nobel Laureates have been working at the IAS. Of the sixteen Abel Prizes awarded since the establishment of that award in 2003, nine were garnered by Institute professors or visiting scholars. Of the fifty-six Cole Prizes awarded since the establishment of that award in 1928, thirty-nine have  gone to scholars associated with the IAS at some point in their career. IAS people have won 20 Wolf Prizes in mathematics and physics. 
Its more than 6,000 former members hold positions of intellectual and scientific leadership throughout the academic world.

Pioneering work on the theory of the stored-program computer as laid down by Alan Turing was done at the IAS by John von Neumann, and the IAS machine built in the basement of the Fuld Hall from 1942 to 1951 under von Neumann's direction introduced the basic architecture of most modern digital computers. The IAS is the leading center of research in string theory and its generalization M-theory introduced by Edward Witten at the IAS in 1995. The Langlands program, a far-reaching approach which unites parts of geometry, mathematical analysis, and number theory was introduced by Robert Langlands, the mathematician who now occupies Albert Einstein's old office at the institute. Langlands was inspired by the work of Hermann Weyl, André Weil, and Harish-Chandra, all scholars with wide-ranging ties to the institute, and the IAS maintains the key repository for the papers of Langlands and the Langlands program. The IAS is a main center of research for homotopy type theory, a modern approach to the foundations of mathematics which is not based on classical set theory.  A special year organized by Institute professor Vladimir Voevodsky and others resulted in a benchmark book in the subject which was published by the institute in 2013.

The institute is or has been the academic home of many of the best minds of their generation. Among them are James Waddell Alexander II, Michael Atiyah, Enrico Bombieri, Shiing-Shen Chern, Pierre Deligne, Freeman J. Dyson, Albert Einstein, Clifford Geertz, Kurt Gödel, Albert Hirschman, George F. Kennan, Tsung-Dao Lee, Avishai Margalit, J. Robert Oppenheimer, Erwin Panofsky, Atle Selberg, John von Neumann, André Weil, Hermann Weyl, Frank Wilczek, Edward Witten, Chen-Ning Yang and Shing-Tung Yau.

Special Year Programs
Flexner's vision of the kind of results that can emerge in an institution devoted to the pursuit of knowledge for its own sake is illustrated by the "Special Year" programs sponsored by the IAS School of Mathematics.   For example, in 2012–13 researchers at the IAS school of mathematics held A Special Year on Univalent Foundations of Mathematics. Intuitionistic type theory was created by the Swedish logician Per Martin-Löf in 1972 to serve as an alternative to set theory as a foundation for mathematics.  The special year brought together researchers in topology, computer science, category theory, and mathematical logic with the goal of formalizing and extending this theory of foundations.  The program was organized by Steve Awodey, Thierry Coquand and Vladimir Voevodsky, and resulted in a book being published in homotopy type theory.  The authors—more than 30 researchers ultimately contributed to the project—noted the essential contribution of the IAS saying,

One of the researchers, Andrej Bauer said,

The book, informally known as The HoTT book, is freely available online.

Criticism
Richard Feynman argued that the IAS does not offer real activity or challenge:

Other Institutes for Advanced Study
The IAS in Princeton is widely recognized as the world's first Institute for Advanced Study. Despite later imitators of the institute's model, it took years before any similar institutions were founded. The Center for Advanced Study in the Behavioral Sciences at Stanford was the first such spinoff in 1954.  This was followed by the National Humanities Center founded in North Carolina in 1978. These two institutions eventually became the core of a consortium known as Some Institutes for Advanced Study (SIAS).  The SIAS consortium includes the original institute in Princeton and nine other institutes founded explicitly to emulate the model of the original IAS.  These ten Institutes for Advanced Study are:

 Center for Advanced Study in the Behavioral Sciences in Stanford, California
 National Humanities Center in North Carolina
 Radcliffe Institute for Advanced Study in Cambridge, Massachusetts
 The Institute for Advanced Study in the Humanities (KWI) in Essen, Germany
 Netherlands Institute for Advanced Study in Amsterdam, the Netherlands (until 2016 in Wassenaar )
 Swedish Collegium for Advanced Study in Uppsala, Sweden
 Berlin Institute for Advanced Study in Berlin, Germany
 Israel Institute for Advanced Studies in Jerusalem
 Nantes Institute for Advanced Study Foundation in Nantes, France
 Stellenbosch Institute for Advanced Study in Stellenbosch, South Africa
 Institute for Advanced Study in Princeton, New Jersey

In recent years there have been other institutes loosely based on the Princeton original, in some cases established with help from IAS professors.  In 1997 IAS professor Chen-Ning Yang helped the Chinese set up the Institute for Advanced Study at Tsinghua University in Beijing.  The Freiburg Institute for Advanced Studies in Freiburg, Germany was founded in 2007, with IAS director at the time Peter Goddard giving the inaugural address. Princeton IAS professors  André Weil and Armand Borel helped to establish close contacts with the Ramanujan Institute for Advanced Study in Mathematics, founded in 1967 as part of the University of Madras in India.

The prestigious Institut des Hautes Études Scientifiques (IHÉS) founded in 1958 just south of Paris is universally acknowledged to be the French counterpart of the IAS in Princeton. Princeton Institute director Robert Oppenheimer had a close relationship with IHÉS founder Léon Motchane and played a major role in helping to get it established. The Dublin Institute for Advanced Studies, which focuses on theoretical physics, cosmic physics, and Celtic studies, was also based on the IAS, and was the second such institute when it was founded in 1940.

Neither the Princeton IAS nor SIAS is connected with, and should not be confused with, the Consortium of Institutes of Advanced Studies which comprises some twenty research institutes located throughout Great Britain and Ireland. The name Institute for Advanced Study, along with the acronym IAS, is also used by various other independent institutions throughout the world, some having little to do with the Princeton model. See Institute for Advanced Study (disambiguation) for a complete list.

Directors, faculty and members

At any given time, the IAS has a faculty consisting of twenty-eight eminent academics who are appointed for life.  Although the faculty do not teach classes (because there are none), they often do give lectures at their own initiative and have the title Professor along with the prestige associated with that title. Furthermore, they direct research and serve as the nucleus of a larger and generally younger group of scholars, whom they have the power to select and invite.  Each year fellowships are awarded to about 190 visiting members from over 100 universities and research institutions who come to the institute for periods from one term to a few years.  Individuals must apply to become members of the institute, and each of the schools has its own application procedures and deadlines.

Campus, Lands, Olden Farm and Olden Manor
The IAS owns over 600 acres of land, most of which was acquired between 1936 and 1945. Since 1997 the institute has preserved 589 acres of woods, wetlands, and farmland. By 1936, for total of $290,000, the founding trustees of the IAS had purchased 256 acres, including the two-hundred-acre Olden Farm with Olden Manor, which was the former home of William Olden. Olden Manor, with its extensive gardens, has been, since 1940, the residence of the institute's director.

See also
 List of Nobel laureates affiliated with the Institute for Advanced Study
 List of Fields medalists affiliated with the Institute for Advanced Study
 List of Cole Prize winners affiliated with the Institute for Advanced Study
 List of Wolf Prize winners affiliated with the Institute for Advanced Study
 Some Institutes for Advanced Study

References

Bibliography 
 Arntzenius, Linda G (2011). Institute for Advanced Study, pub by Arcadia, Charleston, SC. 
 Axtell, James (2007). The Making of Princeton University : From Woodrow Wilson to the Present, Princeton University Press. 
 Batterson, Steve (2006). Pursuit of Genius : Flexner, Einstein, and the Early Faculty at the Institute for Advanced Study, A. K. Peters, Ltd., Wellesley, MA. 
 Bonner, Thomas Neville (2002). Iconoclast: Abraham Flexner and a Life in Learning, Johns Hopkins University Press.  
 Dyson, George (2012). Turing's Cathedral: The Origins of the Digital Universe, Pantheon Books, New York. 
 Edwards, Jon R. (2012). A History of Early Computing at Princeton, Princeton Turing Centennial Celebration, Princeton University, May 10–12, 2012
 Feuer, Lewis Samuel (1974). Einstein and the Generations of Science, Basic Books. 
 Flexner, Abraham (1910).  Medical Education in the United States and Canada: A Report to the Carnegie Foundation for the Advancement of Teaching , Merrymount Press. OCLC 9795002
 Flexner, Abraham (1930). Universities : American, English, German, Oxford Univ. Press, New York, OCLC 238820218
 Flexner, Abraham (1939). The Usefulness of Useless Knowledge, Harpers Magazine, Issue 179, June/November 1939
 Flexner, Abraham (1960). Abraham Flexner : An Autobiography, Simon and Schuster, New York.  OCLC 14616573
 Freiberger, Marianne (2011).  Review of Pursuit of Genius: Flexner, Einstein, and the Early Faculty at the Institute for Advanced Study, The Mathematical Intelligencer
 Frenkel, Edward (2015). Love and Math: The Heart of Hidden Reality, Basic Books, New York, 
 Grattan-Guinness, Ivor (2003). Companion Encyclopedia of the History and Philosophy of the Mathematical Sciences, volume 2, The Johns Hopkins University Press.  
 Gunderman, Richard B.; Gascoine, Kelly; Hafferty, Frederic W.; Kanter, Steven L. (2010). A "paradise for scholars": Flexner and the Institute for Advanced Study, Academic Medicine :  Journal of the Association of American Medical Colleges, November 2010; 85(11): 1784-9
 Institute for Advanced Study (1940). Bulletin No. 9 : History And Organization .
 
 
 
 
 Jogalekar,  Ashutoshon (2013). Ich probiere: Revisiting Abraham Flexners dream of the useful pursuit of useless knowledge, Scientific American, December 12, 2013
 Leitch, Alexander  (1978). The Institute for Advanced Study , in A Princeton Companion, Princeton University Press
 Leitch, Alexander  (1995). Oswald Veblen , in A Princeton Companion, Princeton University Press
 Nasar, Sylvia (1998). A beautiful mind : a biography of John Forbes Nash, Jr., Simon & Schuster, New York, 
 Nevins, Michael (2010). Abraham Flexner: A Flawed American Icon, iUniverse Inc.,  
Britta Padberg (2020). The Global Diversity of Institutes for Advanced Study, Sociologica, vol.14, no.1 (2020) 
 Pais, Abraham & Crease, Robert P. J.  Robert Oppenheimer: A Life, Oxford University Press, New York. 
 Pasachoff, Naomi (1992). Science's 'Intellectual Hotel' : The Institute for Advanced Study, Encyclopædia Britannica Yearbook of Science and the Future. 
 Regis, Ed (1987). Who Got Einstein's Office: Eccentricity and Genius at the Institute for Advanced Study, Addison-Wesley, Reading. 
 Reisz, Matthew (2008).  The perfect brainstorm, Times Higher Education, March 20, 2008
 Scott, Joan Wallach & Keates, Debra, eds (2001). Schools of Thought : Twenty-five Years of Interpretive Social Science, Princeton University Press. A collection of reflective pieces by former fellows at the Institute for Advanced Study School for Social Science. 
 Villani, Cédric (2015). Birth of a Theorem : A Mathematical Adventure, Faber and Faber. 
 Wittrock, Björn (1910). A brief history of institutes for advanced study

External links

 
 "Institute for Advanced Study", a historical overview of the Institute published on the occasion of the 75th anniversary of the founding

 
Schools in Princeton, New Jersey
National Science Foundation mathematical sciences institutes
1930 establishments in New Jersey
Theoretical physics institutes